Global Institute of Science & Technology in Haldia, West Bengal, India, offers diploma engineering courses which are affiliated to West Bengal State Council of Technical Education and degree courses which are affiliated to West Bengal University of Technology.

References

External links 

Universities and colleges in Purba Medinipur district
Colleges affiliated to West Bengal University of Technology
Haldia
Educational institutions in India with year of establishment missing